The 20th Cannes Film Festival was held from 27 April to 12 May 1967. The Grand Prix du Festival International du Film went to the Blowup by Michelangelo Antonioni. The festival opened with J'ai tué Raspoutine, directed by Robert Hossein and closed with Batouk, directed by Jean Jacques Manigot.

Jury
The following people were appointed as the Jury of the 1967 film competition:

Feature films
Alessandro Blasetti (Italy) Jury President
Georges Lourau (France) Vice President
Sergei Bondarchuk (Soviet Union)
René Bonnell (France)
Jean-Louis Bory (France) (critic)
Miklós Jancsó (Hungary)
Claude Lelouch (France)
Shirley MacLaine (USA)
Vincente Minnelli (USA)
Georges Neveux (France)
Gian Luigi Rondi (Italy)
Ousmane Sembène (Senegal)
Short films
Mark Turfkhuyer (Belgium) (journalist) President
Tahar Cheriaa (Tunisia)
André Coutant (France) (technician)
Zdravka Koleva (Bulgaria)
Jean Schmidt (France)

Official selection

In competition - Feature film
The following feature films competed for the Grand Prix du Festival International du Film:

Accident by Joseph Losey
Blowup by Michelangelo Antonioni
A Degree of Murder (Mord und Totschlag) by Volker Schlöndorff
Elvira Madigan by Bo Widerberg
Entranced Earth (Terra em Transe) by Glauber Rocha
Hagbard and Signe (Den røde kappe) by Gabriel Axel
Hotel for Strangers (Hotel pro cizince) by Antonín Máša
I Even Met Happy Gypsies (Skupljači perja) by Aleksandar Petrović
L'immorale by Pietro Germi
Katerina Izmailova by Mikhail Shapiro
The Killing Game (Jeu de massacre) by Alain Jessua
The Last Meeting (Último encuentro) by Antonio Eceiza
My Love, My Love (Mon amour, mon amour) by Nadine Trintignant
Misunderstood (Incompreso) by Luigi Comencini
Monday's Child (La chica del lunes) by Leopoldo Torre Nilsson
Mouchette by Robert Bresson
Pedro Páramo by Carlos Velo
Ten Thousand Days (Tízezer nap) by Ferenc Kósa
Three Days and a Child by Uri Zohar
Ulysses by Joseph Strick
The Unknown Man of Shandigor (L'Inconnu de Shandigor) by Jean-Louis Roy
We Still Kill the Old Way (A ciascuno il suo) by Elio Petri
The Winds of the Aures (Rih al awras) by Mohammed Lakhdar-Hamina
You're a Big Boy Now by Francis Ford Coppola

Films out of competition
The following films were selected to be screened out of competition:

 Batouk by Jean Jacques Manigot
 Closely Watched Trains (Ostre sledované vlaky) by Jiří Menzel
 Le Conquérent de l'inutile (A la mémoire de Lionel Terray) by Marcel Ichac
 I Killed Rasputin (J'ai tué Raspoutine) by Robert Hossein
 Privilege by Peter Watkins
 Restauration du Grand Trianon by Pierre Zimmer
 War and Peace (Voyna i mir) by Sergei Bondarchuk

Short film competition
The following short films competed for the Grand Prix International du Festival:

Crunch-crunch by Carlos Marchiori
Dada by Greta Deses
L'Emploi du temps by Bernard Lemoine
Gloire à Félix Tournachon by André Martin
Herb Alpert and the Tijuana Brass Double Feature by John Hubley
Insitne umenie by Vlado Kubenko
Jedan plus jedan jeste tri by Branko Ranitovic
Larghetto by Waclaw Kondek
Napló by György Kovásznai
Opus by Don Levy
Remedios Varo by Jomí García Ascot
Sky Over Holland by John Fernhout
La Tana by Luigi Di Gianni
Toys by Grant Munro
Versailles by Albert Lamorisse
Die Widerrechtliche Ausübung der Astronomie by Peter Schamoni

Parallel section

International Critics' Week
The following feature films were screened for the 6th International Critics' Week (6e Semaine de la Critique):

 The Bell (Kane) by Yukio Aoshima (Japan)
 L’Horizon by Jacques Rouffio (France)
 Jozsef Katis by Wim Verstappen (Netherlands)
 Love Affair, or the Case of the Missing Switchboard Operator (Ljubavni slučaj ili tragedija službenice P.T.T.) by Dusan Makavejev (Yugoslavia)
 The Times That Are (Le Règne du jour) by Pierre Perrault (Canada)
 Rondo by Zvonimir Berkovic (Yugoslavia)
 Trio by Gianfranco Mingozzi (Italy)
 Ukamau by Jorge Sanjinés Aramayo (Bolivia)
 Warrendale by Allan King (Canada)

Awards

Official awards
The following films and people received the 1967 Official selection awards:
Grand Prix International du Festival: Blowup by Michelangelo Antonioni
Grand Prix Spécial du Jury:
Accident by Joseph Losey
I Even Met Happy Gypsies (Skupljači perja) by Aleksandar Petrović
Best Director: Ferenc Kósa for Ten Thousand Days (Tízezer nap)
Best Screenplay:
Elio Petri for We Still Kill the Old Way (A ciascuno il suo)
Alain Jessua for The Killing Game (Jeu de massacre)
Best Actress: Pia Degermark for Elvira Madigan
Best Actor: Oded Kotler for Three Days and a Child
Best First Work: The Winds of the Aures (Rih al awras) by Mohammed Lakhdar-Hamina
Short films
Grand Prix International du Festival: Sky Over Holland by John Fernhout
Prix spécial du Jury: Gloire à Félix Tournachon by André Martin & Jedan plus jedan jeste tri by Branko Ranitovic-
Short film Technical Prize: Sky Over Holland by John Fernhout
Short film Technical Prize - Special Mention: Versailles by Albert Lamorisse

Independent awards
FIPRESCI
FIPRESCI Prize: 
Skupljači perja by Aleksandar Petrović 
Terra em Transe by Glauber Rocha
Commission Supérieure Technique
Technical Grand Prize - Special Mention: Hagbard and Signe (Den røde kappe) by Gabriel Axel
OCIC Award
 Mouchette by Robert Bresson

References

Media
INA: Opening of the 1967 festival (commentary in French)

External links 
1967 Cannes Film Festival (web.archive)
Official website Retrospective 1967 
Cannes Film Festival Awards for 1967 at Internet Movie Database

Cannes Film Festival, 1967
Cannes Film Festival, 1967
Cannes Film Festival